Sir Thomas Sadleir ( – 5 January 1607) of Standon, Hertfordshire was an English landowner and politician. He was elected MP for Lancaster in 1572 and was Sheriff of Hertfordshire from June to November 1588 and in 1595-6. He was knighted by 1600.

He was the eldest son, and heir, of Sir Ralph Sadleir (1507 – 1587) of Hackney and Standon and Ellen Mitchell, daughter of John Mitchell of Much Hadham, Hertfordshire and "widow" of Matthew Barre of Sevenoaks, Kent.

Sadleir was a student at Trinity Hall, Cambridge in 1554 and was admitted to the Middle Temple in 1558.
He has been described as a man "who lived in honourable reputation for his religion, justice, bounty, love of his country, favour of learning and all other virtues, and as he lived, he ended his life Christianly."

He married, firstly, Ursula Sharington, daughter of Sir Henry Sharington of Lacock, Wiltshire, with whom he had no children;
secondly, Gertrude Markham, daughter of Robert Markham of Cotham, Nottinghamshire, with whom he had a son and a daughter:
 Ralph Sadleir (1579 – 1661), married Anne Coke (1585 – , the eldest daughter of Sir Edward Coke (1552 – 1634) and his first wife, Bridget Paston (d. 1598), daughter of John Paston of Norwich, Norfolk. 
 Gertrude Sadleir, married Walter Aston, 1st Lord Aston of Forfar (1584–1639).

On Saturday 30 April 1603, King James VI of Scotland, on his progress toward London to claim the English throne, came to Standon and having been met by the Bishop of London and a company of gentlemen "in coats and chains of gold," proceeded to Standon Lordship, where he stayed for two nights. "At Sir Thomas Sadleir's, his Majestie was Royally entertained, for himselfe and his Kingly Traine; nothing being wanting the best desired, nor that the meanest could demaund." Traces of the King's visit lingered in the house and more half a century later, in "the King's Chamber", there remained "Three peices of flatcapp hangings of the story of the Marriage of the Queene of Scotts." 

Thomas Sadleir died on 5 January 1607 and was buried in the chancel of the parish church at Standon. An elaborate tomb, with recumbent effigies of Sir Thomas and his wife, has a Latin inscription above:D. O. M.ETMemorise Thomæ Sadleiri, Equitis AuratiHie situs obdormit Christo, Christoque resurgatThomas Sadleirus stemmate Claris equesQuo micuere simul bonitas, prudentia, candor,Cum probitate pudor, cum pietate fides.Heec ilium decorant, bsec sunt monumenta sepultoQui Tumulo decus est et fuit ante suisAttamen hoc posuit monumentum filius illiUt constet pietas officiosa patri.

Under this inscription lies a knight in armour, with a lady on his right hand, and two lions at their feet. On the side of the monument, are effigies of his son and daughter on their knees, with an inscription between them:"Here resteth in assured hope of resurrection in Christ, Sir Thomas Sadleir, of Standon, Knight, son and heir of the Right Honourable Ralph Sadleir, Knight Banneret, Privy Counsellor to three Princes of this land; which Sir Thomas lived in honourable reputation for his learning and all other virtues; and as he lived, he ended his life most Christianly, leaving Ralph and Gertrude his children, by his wife Gertude, daughter of Robert Markham of Cottham in the county of Nottingham, Esq. to whose memory Ralph his sorrowful son in dutiful affection erected this monument, as his last duty. He departed this world the 5th day of January, MDCVI."

He was succeeded by his only son, Ralph.

References

Sources

External links
St Mary's Church, Standon, Hertfordshire at Flickr
Ancient Monuments - Parish Church of St Mary, Standon 

1536 births
1607 deaths
People from Hertfordshire
High Sheriffs of Hertfordshire
English MPs 1572–1583
Knights Bachelor
Thomas